In physics, an electronvolt (symbol eV, also written electron-volt and electron volt) is the measure of an amount of kinetic energy gained by a single electron accelerating from rest through an electric potential difference of one volt in vacuum. When used as a unit of energy, the numerical value of 1 eV in joules (symbol J) is equivalent to the numerical value of the charge of an electron in coulombs (symbol C). Under the 2019 redefinition of the SI base units, this sets 1 eV equal to the exact value 

Historically, the electronvolt was devised as a standard unit of measure through its usefulness in electrostatic particle accelerator sciences, because a particle with electric charge q gains an energy  after passing through a voltage of V. Since q must be an integer multiple of the elementary charge e for any isolated particle, the gained energy in units of electronvolts conveniently equals that integer times the voltage.

It is a common unit of energy within physics, widely used in solid state, atomic, nuclear, and particle physics, and high-energy astrophysics. It is commonly used with SI prefixes milli-, kilo-, mega-, giga-, tera-, peta- or exa- (meV, keV, MeV, GeV, TeV, PeV and EeV respectively). In some older documents, and in the name Bevatron, the symbol BeV is used, which stands for billion (109) electronvolts; it is equivalent to the GeV.

Definition
An electronvolt is the amount of kinetic energy gained or lost by a single electron accelerating from rest through an electric potential difference of one volt in vacuum. Hence, it has a value of one volt, multiplied by the elementary charge  Therefore, one electronvolt is equal to 

The electronvolt (eV) is a unit of energy, but is not an SI unit. The SI unit of energy is the joule (J).

Relation to other physical properties and units

Mass
By mass–energy equivalence, the electronvolt corresponds to a unit of mass. It is common in particle physics, where units of mass and energy are often interchanged, to express mass in units of eV/c2, where c is the speed of light in vacuum (from ). It is common to informally express mass in terms of eV as a unit of mass, effectively using a system of natural units with c set to 1.

The atomic mass constant (mu), one twelfth of the mass a carbon-12 atom, is close to the mass of a proton. To convert to electronvolt mass-equivalent, use the formula:

Momentum
By dividing a particle's kinetic energy in electronvolts by the fundamental constant c (the speed of light), one can describe the particle's momentum in units of eV/c. In natural units in which the fundamental velocity constant c is numerically 1, the c may informally be omitted to express momentum as electronvolts. 

The energy momentum relation

in natural units (with )

is a Pythagorean equation.

Dividing the units of energy (such as eV) by a fundamental constant (such as the speed of light) that has units of velocity facilitates the required conversion for using energy units to describe momentum.

For example, if the momentum p of an electron is said to be , then the conversion to MKS system of units can be achieved by:

Distance
In particle physics, a system of natural units in which the speed of light in vacuum c and the reduced Planck constant ħ are dimensionless and equal to unity is widely used: . In these units, both distances and times are expressed in inverse energy units (while energy and mass are expressed in the same units, see mass–energy equivalence). In particular, particle scattering lengths are often presented in units of inverse particle masses.

Outside this system of units, the conversion factors between electronvolt, second, and nanometer are the following:

The above relations also allow expressing the mean lifetime τ of an unstable particle (in seconds) in terms of its decay width Γ (in eV) via .

Conversely, the tiny meson mass differences responsible for meson oscillations are often expressed in the more convenient inverse picoseconds.

Energy in electronvolts is sometimes expressed through the wavelength of light with photons of the same energy:

Temperature
In certain fields, such as plasma physics, it is convenient to use the electronvolt to express temperature. The electronvolt is divided by the Boltzmann constant to convert to the Kelvin scale:

where kB is the Boltzmann constant.

Wavelength

The energy E, frequency v, and wavelength λ of a photon are related by

where h is the Planck constant, c is the speed of light. This reduces to

Similarly,  would correspond to an infrared photon of wavelength  or frequency .

Scattering experiments
In a low-energy nuclear scattering experiment, it is conventional to refer to the nuclear recoil energy in units of eVr, keVr, etc. This distinguishes the nuclear recoil energy from the "electron equivalent" recoil energy (eVee, keVee, etc.) measured by scintillation light. For example, the yield of a phototube is measured in phe/keVee (photoelectrons per keV electron-equivalent energy). The relationship between eV, eVr, and eVee depends on the medium the scattering takes place in, and must be established empirically for each material.

Energy comparisons

Per mole
One mole of particles given 1 eV of energy each has approximately 96.5 kJ of energy – this corresponds to the Faraday constant (F ≈ ), where the energy in joules of n moles of particles each with energy E eV is equal to E·F·n.

See also
Orders of magnitude (energy)

References

External links
BIPM's definition of the electronvolt
physical constants reference; CODATA data

Particle physics
Units of chemical measurement
Units of energy
Voltage